Erwin Riess (born March 13, 1957), is an Austrian political scientist, playwright and journalist; He has been a wheelchair user since 1983, he is an activist for the disabled and has been a freelance writer since 1994 writing plays, radio plays, scripts and prose.

Life
Erwin Riess attended school in Krems, Austria and later returned to Vienna to study political and theatre science.   In 1983 he was relegated to a wheelchair after the discovery of a back tumor.  He has since been active in disability campaigns and humanitarian efforts to improve living conditions for disabled persons living in Austria.

He is a freelance writer providing material for many magazines and newspapers and writing theatrical works, many of which have been performed internationally. Based on the life of Stephen Hawking, "Hawking's Dream" is arguably his most famous and well-received work.

Works
 Kuruzzen: A Chronicle from the Time of Prince Eugene (1996)
 Adieu Madrid (1997)
 Hawking's Dream (1998)
 Mr. Groll experiences the world (1999)
 Giordanos Order (novel, 1999)
 My Austria (2001)

External links
 erwin-riess.at Website de Erwin Riess
 
 Erwin Riess Austrian Society for Literature

References

1957 births
Living people
20th-century Austrian dramatists and playwrights
21st-century Austrian dramatists and playwrights
21st-century Austrian novelists
Austrian male dramatists and playwrights
Austrian male novelists